Márk Marsi (born 17 August 1973) is a Hungarian épée and foil fencer. He competed at the 1996 and 2000 Summer Olympics.

References

External links
 

1973 births
Living people
Hungarian male épée fencers
Hungarian male foil fencers
Olympic fencers of Hungary
Fencers at the 1996 Summer Olympics
Fencers at the 2000 Summer Olympics
Fencers from Budapest